is a Japanese gymnast. He competed at the 2000 Summer Olympics.

References

External links
 

1976 births
Living people
Japanese male artistic gymnasts
Olympic gymnasts of Japan
Gymnasts at the 2000 Summer Olympics
Sportspeople from Mie Prefecture
Asian Games medalists in gymnastics
Gymnasts at the 1998 Asian Games
Asian Games bronze medalists for Japan
Medalists at the 1998 Asian Games
20th-century Japanese people
21st-century Japanese people